Franco Rossi may refer to:

Franco Rossi (director) (1919–2000), Italian director
Franco Rossi (athlete), Italian Paralympic athlete
Franco Rossi (ice hockey) (1916–2006), Italian ice hockey player
Franco Rossi, Jr., American actor
Franco Rossi (musician), Italian cellist

See also
Francesco Rosi (1922–2015), Italian film director
Franco Rosso (1941–2016), Italian-born film producer and director